Zulgo-Gemzek is an Afro-Asiatic language spoken in northern Cameroon.  Dialects are Gemzek, Mineo, and Zulgo (Zəlgwa). Blench (2006) considers Zəlgwa-Minew and Gemzek to be distinct languages.

Dialects
According to the Linguistic Atlas of Cameroon (2012), Zelgwa and Minew make up a single language called Zelgwa Minew. The Zelgwa and Minew varieties are very close to each other. Gemzek is rather different from these two languages and is treated as a separate language by the Linguistic Atlas of Cameroon.

The Zelgwa, as well as the Gemzek, inhabit the massifs of the same name that form the eastern edge of the Mandara Mountains, north of Meri, as well as the neighboring plain to the east and the plateau to the west (Sérawa canton, Tokombéré commune, Mayo-Sava department, Far North Region). The Minew inhabit the western edge of the Mandara Mountains (Gaboua canton, Koza commune, Mayo-Tsanaga department, Far North Region), some 10 kilometers from Sérawa.

Gemzek and Zelgwa are two distinct languages, although there is some mutual intelligibility between them. The Gemzek (8,000-10,000 speakers) inhabit the Gemzek massif, which forms the eastern edge of the Mandara Mountains north of Méri, as well as the adjacent plain to the east and the plateau to the west (Sérawa canton, Tokombéré commune, Mayo-Sava department, Far North Region).

Notes

References 
 Beat Haller.  1980. Phonology of Zulgo. Yaoundé: Société Internationale de Linguistique.

External link
An outline sketch of Gemzek Grammar

Languages of Cameroon
Biu-Mandara languages